Jere Forsberg (born 3 March 1994) is a Finnish Paralympic archer. He represented Finland at the 2012 Summer Paralympics held in London, United Kingdom and he won the gold medal in the men's individual compound open event. He also represented Finland at the 2016 Summer Paralympics held in Rio de Janeiro, Brazil and he did not win a medal this time.

At the 2013 World Para-archery Championships held in Bangkok, Thailand, he won the silver medal in the men's individual compound event.

References

External links 
 

Living people
1994 births
Place of birth missing (living people)
Paralympic gold medalists for Finland
Archers at the 2012 Summer Paralympics
Archers at the 2016 Summer Paralympics
Medalists at the 2012 Summer Paralympics
Paralympic medalists in archery
Paralympic archers of Finland
21st-century Finnish people